The Downtown Millen Historic District is a  historic district in Millen, Georgia which was listed on the National Register of Historic Places in 1996.  It then included 44 contributing buildings, four contributing structures, and two contributing objects.

It also included 15 non-contributing buildings.

Notable properties in the district include:

References

External links

Colonial Revival architecture in Georgia (U.S. state)
Buildings designated early commercial in the National Register of Historic Places
National Register of Historic Places in Jenkins County, Georgia
Historic districts on the National Register of Historic Places in Georgia (U.S. state)